Charlotte Lennox, Duchess of Richmond (née Lady Charlotte Gordon; 20 September 1768 – 5 May 1842), was a British aristocrat and peeress best known as the hostess of the Duchess of Richmond's ball.

Biography
Born at Gordon Castle, Lady Charlotte Gordon was the eldest child of Alexander Gordon, 4th Duke of Gordon, and his wife, Jane Maxwell. On 9 September 1789, she married Charles Lennox, 4th Duke of Richmond, 4th Duke of Lennox and 4th Duke of Aubigny.

In 1814, the family moved to Brussels, where the Duchess gave the ball at which the Duke of Wellington received confirmation that the Army of the North under the command of Napoleon Bonaparte had entered the territory of the United Kingdom of the Netherlands near Charleroi (in what is now the Kingdom of Belgium). The Duchess and her family continued to live in Brussels until 1818, when her husband was appointed Governor General of British North America. The Duchess was widowed in 1819, and in 1836, she inherited the vast Gordon estates on the death of her brother, George Gordon, 5th Duke of Gordon, who had left no legitimate children. She died at the age of 73 in London on 5 May 1842.

Family
The Duke and Duchess had seven sons and seven daughters:
Charles Gordon-Lennox, 5th Duke of Richmond (1791–1860). Diana, Princess of Wales (1961–1997) descended from him through his daughter Lady Cecilia Catherine Gordon-Lennox and her daughter Rosalind Hamilton, Duchess of Abercorn.
Lady Mary Lennox (c. 1792 – 7 December 1847), married Sir Charles Fitzroy and had issue.
Lieutenant-Colonel Lord John George Lennox (3 October 1793 – 10 November 1873), married Louisa Rodney and had issue.
Lady Sarah Lennox (c. 1794 – 8 September 1873), married Peregrine Maitland.
Lady Georgiana Lennox (30 September 1795 – 15 December 1891), married William FitzGerald-de Ros, 23rd Baron de Ros, and had issue.
Lord Henry Adam Lennox (6 September 1797 – 25 February 1812), fell overboard from HMS Blake and drowned.
Lord William Pitt Lennox (20 September 1799 – 18 February 1881), married first Mary Ann Paton and second Ellen Smith; had issue by the latter.
Lady Jane Lennox (c. 1800 – 27 March 1861), married Laurence Peel and had issue.
Captain Lord Frederick Lennox (24 January 1801 – 25 October 1829).
Lord Sussex Lennox (11 June 1802 – 12 April 1874), married Hon. Mary Lawless and had issue.
Lady Louisa Maddelena Lennox (2 October 1803 – 2 March 1900), married Rt. Hon. William Tighe, died without issue.
Lady Charlotte Lennox (c. 1804 – 20 August 1833), married Maurice Berkeley, 1st Baron FitzHardinge of Bristol, and had issue.
Lieutenant-Colonel Lord Arthur Lennox (2 October 1806 – 15 January 1864), married Adelaide Campbell and had issue.
Lady Sophia Georgiana Lennox (21 July 1809 – 17 January 1902), married Lord Thomas Cecil, died without issue.

Notes

References

 Endnotes:

1768 births
1842 deaths
People from Aberdeenshire
English duchesses by marriage
Daughters of British dukes
Wives of knights
Burials at Chichester Cathedral